Amoroso Katamsi (21 October 1940 – 17 April 2018) was an Indonesian actor and artist. He is well known by Penumpasan Pengkhianatan G 30 S PKI created in 1982 by director, Arifin C. Noer and by Djakarta 1966 supported by Umar Kayam with same director. He became chief of PARFI.

Filmography
Movies
 "Cinta Abadi" (1976) starred by Erna Santoso
 "Menanti Kelahiran" (1976) starred by Vonny Pawaka
 "Cinta Putih" (1977) starred by Yati Octavia
 "Terminal Cinta" (1977) starred by W.S. Rendra
 "Serangan Fajar" (1981)
 "Djakarta 1966" (1982) 
 "Pasukan Berani Mati" (1982) 
 "Perkawinan 83" (1982)
 "Penumpasan Pengkhianatan G 30 S PKI" (1984)
 "Bila Saatnya Tiba" (1985)
 "Bisikan Setan" (1985)
 "Pergaulan" (1994)
 "Dibalik 98"(2015)

Soap operas 
 Hidayah (2005)
 Di Atas Sajadah Cinta (2006)
 Hingga Akhir Waktu (2008)
 Anak Durhaka (MNCTV)
 Tukang Bubur Naik Haji'' (2013)

References

External links
 Profil di Pusat Dokumentasi Seni Bidang Film via archive.is; accessed 17 April 2018.

1940 births
2018 deaths
20th-century Indonesian male singers
Indonesian male actors
Male actors from Jakarta